Chelsea is an unincorporated community in Saluda Township, Jefferson County, Indiana.

History 
A post office was established at Chelsea in 1883, and remained in operation until it was discontinued in 1903. The community was likely named directly or indirectly after Chelsea, London.

Chelsea was hit by a tornado on March 2, 2012, in which three people died. A fourth fatality occurred about one mile away in Paynesville.

Geography 
It is located on Indiana 62, between New Washington and Hanover.

See also 
Tornado outbreak of March 2–3, 2012

References 

Unincorporated communities in Jefferson County, Indiana
Unincorporated communities in Indiana